It covers film titles that begin with a number, whether written in Arabic numerals or spelled out. Excluding articles (e.g., "a", "an", "the" in English), it does not include film titles containing numbers after the first word.

In numerical order

0

 00 Schneider – Jagd auf Nihil Baxter (1994)
 Zero (2018)
 Zero Charisma (2013)
 Zero Dark Thirty (2012)
 Zero Day (2003)
 Zero Effect (1998)
 Zero for Conduct (1933)
 Zero Hour! (1957)
 Zero Kelvin (1995)
 Zero Tolerance (1995)

Decimals

 .45 (2006)
 0.5mm (2014)

1

 The $1,000,000 Reward (1920)
 One Hundred and One Dalmatians (1961)
 One Hundred Men and a Girl (1937)
 One A.M. (1916)
 One Day (2011)
 One False Move (1992)
 One Fine Day (1996)
 Day One (1989)
 One Flew Over the Cuckoo's Nest (1975)
 One Hour Photo (2002)
 One Million Years B.C. (1966)
 One More Time (1970)
 One Night with the King (2006)
 One Night of Love (1934)
 The 1 Second Film (2007)
 #1 Serial Killer (2013)
 One, Two, Three (1961)
 One Way Passage (1932)
 One Week: (1920 & 2008)
 One of Our Dinosaurs Is Missing (1975)
 10 (1979)
 The Ten Commandments: The Movie (2016)
 10 Cloverfield Lane (2016)
 10 Items or Less (2006)
 Ten Little Indians: (1965 & 1989)
 10 Rillington Place (1971)
 10 Rules for Sleeping Around (2013)
 10 Things I Hate About You (1999)
 10 to Midnight (1983)
 10 Years (2011)
 Ten Years (2015)
 10 Years Later (2010)
 10,000 BC (2008)
 100 Bloody Acres (2013)
 100 Days with Mr. Arrogant (2004)
 100 Feet (2008)
 100 Rifles (1969)
 101 Dalmatians (1996)
 101 Dalmatians II: Patch's London Adventure (2003)
 101 Rent Boys (2000)
 101 Reykjavík (2000)
 102 Dalmatians (2000)
 108 Demon Kings (2015)
 10000 Years Later (2015)
 10th & Wolf (2006)
 The 10th Kingdom (2000) (TV)
 The 10th Victim (1965)
 10½ (2010)
 11-11-11 (2011)
 11:14 (2003)
 11M: Terror in Madrid (2022)
 The 11th Hour (2007)
 12: (2003 & 2007)
 12 Angry Men: (1957 & 1997)
 12 Citizens (2014)
 12 and Holding (2005)
 12 Hour Shift (2020)
 12 Men of Christmas (2009) (TV)
 12 Monkeys (1995)
 12 Rounds (2009)
 12 Rounds 2: Reloaded (2013)
 12 Rounds 3: Lockdown (2015)
 12 Years a Slave (2013)
 12 Strong (2018)
 125 Years Memory (2015)
 127 Hours (2010)
 12:01 (1993)
 12:01 PM (1990)
 12th and Delaware (2010)
 13 (2010 & 2022)
 13th (2016)
 13 Assassins: (1963 & 2010)
 13 Beloved (2006)
 Thirteen Days (2000)
 13 Ghosts (1960)
 Thirteen Ghosts (2001)
 13 Going on 30 (2004)
 13 Hours: The Secret Soldiers of Benghazi (2016)
 13 Moons (2002)
 13 Rue Madeleine (1947)
 13 Sins (2014)
 13 Tzameti (2006)
 The 13th Warrior (1999)
 137 Shots (2021)
 14 Peaks: Nothing Is Impossible (2021)
 1408 (2007)
 1492: Conquest of Paradise (1992)
 15 August (2019 film) (2019)
 15 Minutes (2001)
 15: The Movie (2003)
 The 15:17 to Paris (2018)
 16 Blocks (2005)
 16-Love (2012)
 16 Wishes (2010)
 17 Again (2009)
 1776 (1972)
 18 Again! (1988)
 18 Presents (2020)
 19 (2001)
 #1915House (2018)
 Nineteen Eighty-Four (1984)
 1900 (1976)
 1917: (1970 & 2019)
 1920 series:
 1920 (2008)
 1920: The Evil Returns (2012)
 1920: London (2016)
 1922 (2017)
 1941 (1979)
 1968 Tunnel Rats (2009)
 1984 (1956)
 1990: The Bronx Warriors (1983)
 1991: The Year Punk Broke (1992)
 The One (2001)
 One-Way Ticket to Mombasa (2002)
 The Thirteenth Floor (1999)
 A Thousand Acres (1997)
 A Thousand Clowns (1965)
 A Thousand Words (2012)
 Twelve (2010)

2

 2 Days in New York (2012)
 2 Days in Paris (2007)
 2 Days in the Valley (1996)
 The Two Faces of January (2014)
 Two Family House (2002)
 2 Fast 2 Furious (2003)
 2 Guns (2013)
 The Two Jakes (1990)
 Two Lovers (2008)
 Two Mules for Sister Sara (1970)
 Two Solitudes (1978)
 Two Thousand Maniacs! (1964)
 Two Weeks Notice (2002)
 Two Women (1960)
 Two for the Money (2005)
 2 or 3 Things I Know About Her (1967)
 2 States (2014)
 20 Dates (1998)
 20 Feet From Stardom (2013)
 20 Million Miles to Earth (1957)
 20th Century Girl (2022)
 20,000 Leagues Under the Sea: (1907, 1916, 1954, 1997 Hallmark, & 1997 Village Roadshow)
 20,000 Years in Sing Sing (1932)
 200 Motels (1971)
 200 Pounds Beauty (2006)
 2000 Maniacs (1964)
 2001 Maniacs (2005)
 2001 Maniacs: Field of Screams (2010)
 2001: A Space Odyssey (1968)
 2001: A Space Travesty (2000)
 2009 Lost Memories (2002)
 2010 (1984)
 2012 (2009)
 2019, After the Fall of New York (1984)
 2020 Texas Gladiators (1984)
 2036: Nexus Dawn (2017 short)
 2046 (2004)
 2048: Nowhere to Run (2017 short)
 2050 (2018)
 2067 (2020)
 2081 (2009)
 Twenty-One (1991)
 21 (2008)
 21 & Over (2013)
 21 Grams (2003)
 21 Jump Street (2012)
 21 Up (1977)
 22 Jump Street (2014)
 23 (1998)
 23 Blast (2013)
 23 Paces to Baker Street (1956)
 24 City (2008)
 24 Frames (2017)
 24 Hour Party People (2002)
 25th Hour (2002)
 27 Dresses (2008)
 28 Days (2000)
 28 Days Later (2002)
 28 Hotel Rooms (2012)
 28 up (1984)
 28 Weeks Later (2007)
 29th Street (1991)
 2:22 (2017)
 2:37 (2006)

3

 Three Amigos (1986)
 Three Billboards Outside Ebbing, Missouri (2017)
 The Three Burials of Melquiades Estrada (2005)
 Three Coins in the Fountain (1954)
 Three Colors series:
 Three Colors: Blue (1993)
 Three Colors: Red (1994)
 Three Colors: White (1994)
 Three Comrades (1938)
 Three on a Couch (1966)
 Three Days of the Condor (1975)
 3 Days to Kill (2014)
 3 Dev Adam (1973)
 The Three Faces of Eve (1957)
 Three Fugitives (1989)
 3G (2013)
 3 Godfathers (1948)
 Three Godfathers (1936)
 The Three Godfathers (1916)
 Three the Hard Way (1974)
 3 Idiots (2009)
 Three Kings (1999)
 Three on a Match (1932)
 Three Men and a Baby (1987)
 Three Men and a Little Lady (1990)
 Three Mothers (2006)
 The Three Musketeers: (1921, 1933, 1948, 1973, 1992, 1993 & 2011)
 3 Ninjas (1992)
 3 Ring Circus (1954)
 Three for the Road (1987)
 Three Sisters: (1966, 1970, 1970 Olivier & 1994)
 Three to Tango (1999)
 3 Women (1977)
 Three Young Texans (1954)
 3,2,1... Frankie Go Boom (2012)
 3-Iron (2004)
 30 Days of Night (2007)
 30 Days of Night: Dark Days (2010)
 30-Love (2014)
 30 Minutes or Less (2011)
 300 (2006)
 300: Rise of an Empire (2014)
 The 300 Spartans (1962)
 3000 Miles to Graceland (2001)
 301, 302 (1995)
 3022 (2019)
 31 (2016)
 35 up (1991)
 The 355 (2022)
 36 Hours (1965)
 360 (2011)
 The 36th Chamber of Shaolin (1979)
 36th Precinct (2004)
 The 39 Steps: (1935, 1959, 1978 & 2008 TV)
 3: The Dale Earnhardt Story (2004)
 3:10 to Yuma: (1957 & 2007)
 The Third Man (1949)
 Thr3e (2007)
 Three (2002)
 Three... Extremes (2004)
 π (1998)

4

 Four Brothers (2005)
 Four Daughters (1938)
 4 Days in May (2011)
 Four Feathers: (1939, 1978 & 2002)
 Four Flies on Grey Velvet (1972)
 Four Horsemen of the Apocalypse (1962)
 The Four Horsemen of the Apocalypse (1921)
 Four Lions (2010)
 4 Little Girls (1997)
 4 Months, 3 Weeks and 2 Days (2007)
 The Four Musketeers (1974)
 Four Rooms (1995)
 The Four Seasons (1981)
 4 for Texas (1963)
 Four for Venice (1998)
 Four Weddings and a Funeral (1994)
 4.3.2.1 (2010)
 40 Days and 40 Nights (2002)
 40 Year Old Virgin (2005)
 The 400 Blows (1959)
 42 (2013)
 42 up (1998)
 42nd Street (1933)
 44 Inch Chest (2010)
 44 Minutes: The North Hollywood Shoot-Out (2003)
 47 Meters Down (2017)
 47 Meters Down: Uncaged (2019)
 47 Ronin (2013)
 48 Hrs. (1982)
 49th Parallel (1941)
 4D Man (1959)
 The 4th Floor (2000)
 The Fourth Kind (2009)
 The Fourth Man (1983)
 The Fourth Protocol (1987)

5

 Da 5 Bloods (2020)
 5 Broken Cameras (2011)
 5 Card Stud (1968)
 5 Centimeters per Second (2007)
 5 Days of War (2011)
 Five Easy Pieces (1970)
 5 Fingers (1952)
 Five Feet Apart  (2019)
 Five Fingers (2006)
 Five Fingers of Death (1973)
 Five Graves to Cairo (1943)
 The Five Man Army (1969)
 Five Minutes of Heaven (2009)
 The Five Senses (1999)
 Five Weeks in a Balloon (1962)
 50 First Dates (2004)
 The 51st State (2001)
 52 Pick-Up (1986)
 54 (1998)
 55 Days at Peking (1963)
 The Fifth Element (1997)
 5x2 (2004)
 (500) Days of Summer (2009)
 The 5,000 Fingers of Dr. T (1953)
 Five Million Years to Earth (1967)
 50/50 (2011)
 #50Fathers (2015)
 The Five People you Meet in Heaven (2004)
 Five Children and It (2004)

6

 6 Angels (2002)
 6 Below: Miracle on the Mountain (2017)
 6 Days (2017)
 6 Underground (2019)
 6 Souls (2010)
 61* (2001) (TV)
 The 6th Day (2000)
 The 601st Phone Call (2006)
 633 Squadron (1964)
 64: Part I (2016)
 64: Part II (2016)
 65 (2022)
 65 (2022)
 #66 (2015)
 678 (2010)
 #69 Samskar Colony (2022)
 Ridiculous Six (2015)
 Six Days, Seven Nights (1998)
 Six Degrees of Separation (1993)
 Six Pack (1982)
 Sixteen Candles (1984)
 The Sixth Sense (1999)

7

 The Magnificent Seven (1960)
 Seven Beauties (1976)
 Seven Brides for Seven Brothers (1954)
 7 Faces of Dr. Lao (1964)
 7 Khoon Maaf (2011)
 Seven Men from Now (1956)
 Seven Pounds (2008)
 Seven Psychopaths (2012)
 Seven Samurai (1954)
 7 Seconds (2005)
 Seven Swords (2005)
 The Seven Tapes (2012)
 Seven Up! (1964)
 7 Women (1966)
 The Seven Year Itch (1955)
 Seven Years in Tibet (1997)
 7:35 in the Morning (2003)
 Seventh Heaven: (1927, 1937 & 1993)
 The Seventh Seal (1957)
 The Seventh Sign (1988)
 Seventh Son (2015)
 The Seventh Victim (1943)
 The 7th Voyage of Sinbad (1958)
 Se7en (1995)
 The Seven-Ups (1973)
 7½ Phere (2005)
 "#73, Shaanthi Nivaasa" (2007)
 Snow White and the Seven Dwarfs (1937 film) (1937)

8

 8 x 10 Tasveer (2009)
 Eight Ball (1992)
 Eight Bells (1935)
 Eight Below (2006)
 Eight Crazy Nights (2002)
 Eight Days a Week (1998)
 The Eight Diagram Pole Fighter (1984)
 Eight Girls in a Boat (1932)
 Eight Girls in a Boat (1934)
 8 Heads in a Duffel Bag (1997)
 Eight Hours of Terror (1957)
 Eight Iron Men (1952)
 Eight Legged Freaks (2002)
 Eight Men Out (1988)
 8 Mile (2002)
 8 Million Ways to Die (1986)
 Eight Minutes to Midnight: A Portrait of Dr. Helen Caldicott (1981)
 Eight O'Clock Walk (1954)
 Eight on the Lam (1967)
 8 Ounces (2003)
 8 Seconds (1994)
 8 Women (2002)
 Eighth Grade (2018)
 84 Charing Cross Road: (1975 TV & 1987)
 88 Minutes (2008)
 8: The Mormon Proposition (2010)
 8mm (1999)
 8mm 2 (2005)
 8½ (1963)
 8½ Women (1999)
 8000 Miles (2009)
 The Hateful Eight (2015)
 The 8th Night (2021)

9

 9: (2005 short & 2009)
 Nine (2009)
 Nine Dead (2009)
 9 Dead Gay Guys (2002)
 9 to 5 (1980)
 Nine Hours to Rama (1963)
 Nine Lives: (1957, 2002, 2005 & 2016)
 Nine Miles Down (2009)
 Nine Months (1995)
 Nine Queens (2000)
 9 Songs (2004)
 9 Souls (2003)
 9/11 (2002)
 9012Live (1985)
 976-EVIL (1989)
 9th Company (2005)
 The 9th Life of Louis Drax (2016)
 9½ Weeks (1986)
 The Nines (2007)
 The Ninth Configuration (1980)
 The Ninth Gate (1999)

In numerical order (by number value)

0–π 

 Zero Effect (1998)
 Zero Dark Thirty (2012)
 Zero Theorem (2013)
 .45 (2006)
 0.5 mm (2014)
 One A.M. (1916)
 One Flew Over the Cuckoo's Nest (1975)
 One Hour Photo (2002)
 One More Time (1970)
 One Night of Love (1934)
 One of Our Dinosaurs Is Missing (1975)
 The 1 Second Film (2007)
 #1 Serial Killer (2013)
 One, Two, Three (1961)
 One Week: (1920 & 2008)
 One-Way Ticket to Mombasa (2002)
 2 Days in New York (2012)
 2 Fast 2 Furious (2004)
 Two for the Money (2005)
 The Two Jakes (1990)
 Two Mules for Sister Sara (1970)
 Two Solitudes (1978)
 Two Weeks Notice (2002)
 Two Women (1960)
 The Third Man (1949)
 Three (2002)
 Three... Extremes (2004)
 Three Amigos (1986)
 Three Billboards Outside Ebbing, Missouri (2017)
 The Three Burials of Melquiades Estrada (2005)
 Three Coins in the Fountain (1954)
 Three Colors: Blue (1993)
 Three Colors: Red (1994)
 Three Colors: White (1994)
 Three Comrades (1938)
 Three on a Couch (1966)
 Three Days of the Condor (1975)
 The Three Faces of Eve (1957)
 Three Fugitives (1989)
 Three the Hard Way (1974)
 Three Kings (1999)
 Three on a Match (1932)
 Three Men and a Baby (1987)
 Three Men and a Little Lady (1990)
 The Three Musketeers: (1921, 1933, 1973, 1992 & 1993)
 3 Ring Circus (1954)
 Three for the Road (1987)
 Three Sisters: (1970 Olivier & 1994)
 Three Young Texans (1954)
 3,2,1... Frankie Go Boom (2012)
 π (1998)

4–6 

 4D Man (1959)
 Four Daughters (1938)
 Four Feathers: (1939 & 2002)
 Four Horsemen of the Apocalypse (1962)
 The Four Horsemen of the Apocalypse (1921)
 4 Months, 3 Weeks and 2 Days (2007)
 The Four Musketeers (1974)
 Four Rooms (1995)
 The Four Seasons (1981)
 Four Weddings and a Funeral (1994)
 The Fourth Man (1983)
 The Fourth Protocol (1987)
 5x2 (2004)
 5 Broken Cameras (2011)
 5 Card Stud (1968)
  5 Centimeters Per Second (2007)
 The Fifth Element (1997)
 Five Easy Pieces (1970)
 5 Fingers (1952)
 5ive Girls (2006)
 Five Graves to Cairo (1943)
 The Five Man Army (1969)
 Five Minutes of Heaven (2009)
 Five Weeks in a Balloon (1962)
 The 6th Day (2000)
 Six Degrees of Separation (1993)
 Six Days Seven Nights (1998)
 The Sixth Sense (1999)

7–9 

 Se7en (1995)
 Seven Beauties (1976)
 Seven Brides for Seven Brothers (1954)
 Seven Up! (1964)
 Seven Psychopaths (2012)
 The Seven Samurai (1954)
 7 Women (1966)
 The Seven Year Itch (1955)
 Seventh Heaven: (1927, 1937 & 1993)
 The Seventh Seal (1957)
 The Seventh Sign (1988)
 Seven Years in Tibet (1997)
 7:35 in the Morning (2003)
 Eight Below (2006)
 Eight Crazy Nights (2002)
 Eight Men Out (1988)
 8 Women (2002)
 8 Mile (2002)
 8 Heads in a Duffel Bag (1997)
 Eight on the Lam (1967)
 Eighth Grade (2018)
 8: The Mormon Proposition (2010)
 8-Bit Christmas (2021)
 8mm (1999)
 8mm 2 (2005)
 8½ (1963)
 8½ Women (1999)
 9: (2005 short & 2009)
 9/11 (2002)
 9½ Weeks (1986)
 The Nines (2007)
 Nine Dead (2009)
 9 Dead Gay Guys (2002)
 The Ninth Configuration (1980)
 The Ninth Gate (1999)
 The 9th Life of Louis Drax (2016)
 9 Songs (2004)
 Nine to Five (1980)

10–99 

 10 (1979)
 10/31 (2017)
 10½ (2010)
 10 Cloverfield Lane (2016)
 The Ten Commandments: The Movie (2016)
 10 Items or Less (2006)
 Ten Little Indians (1965)
 Ten Little Indians (1989)
 10 Questions for the Dalai Lama (2006)
 10 Things I Hate About You (1999)
 The Ten (2007)
  The Ten Commandments: (1923, 1956, 2007)
 The 10th Kingdom (2000) (TV)
 The 10th Victim (1965)
 10th & Wolf (2006)
 11'09"01 September 11 (2002)
 11:14 (2003)
 Twelve (2010)
 12 (2007)
 12 and Holding (2006)
 12 Angry Men (1957)
 The Twelve Chairs: (1962, 1970, 1971 & 1976)
 12 Citizens (2014)
 12 Monkeys (1995)
 12 O'Clock Boys (2013)
 The Twelve Tasks of Asterix (1976)
 12 Years A Slave (2013)
 13 (2010)
 13th (2016)
 13 Ghosts (1960)
 13 Going on 30 (2004)
 The Thirteen Chairs (1969)
 Thirteen Ghosts (2001)
 Thirteen (2003)
 Thirteen Days (2000)
 13 Hours: The Secret Soldiers of Benghazi (2016)
 13 Moons (2002)
 Las 13 rosas (2007)
 The 13th Warrior (1999)
 The Thirteenth Floor (1999)
 15 Minutes (2001)
 15: The Movie (2003)
 16 Blocks (2006)
 Sixteen Candles (1984)
 16 December (2002)
 16 Wishes (2010)
 17 Again (2009)
 Twenty-One (1991)
 21 (2008)
 21 Grams (2003)
 21 Jump Street (2012)
 21 Up (1977)
 22 Jump Street (2014)
 23 (1998)
 23rd March 1931: Shaheed (2002)
 The Number 23 (2007)
 24 City (2008)
 24 Hour Party People (2002)
 25th Hour (2002)
 27 Dresses (2008)
 28 up (1984)
 28 Days (2000)
 28 Days Later (2002)
 28 Weeks Later (2007)
 29th Street (film) (1991)
 -30- (2016)
 30 Days of Night (2007)
 30-Love (2014)
 30 Minutes or Less (2011)
 31 (2016)
 31st October (2016)
 35 Shots of Rum (2009)
 35 up (1991)
 The 36th Chamber of Shaolin (1978)
 36 China Town (2006)
 36 Ghante (1974)
 The 39 Steps: (1935, 1959 & 1978)
 40 Days and 40 Nights (2002)
 The 40-Year-Old Virgin (2005)
 42 (2013)
 42 up (1998)
 42nd Street (1933)
 The 47 ronin: (1941, 1994)
 47 Ronin (2013)
 Black 47 (2018)
 48 Hrs. (1982)
 49th Parallel (1941)
 49 up (2005)
 50/50 (2011)
 #50Fathers (2015)
 50 First Dates (2004)
 50 Ways of Saying Fabulous (2005)
 51 (2011)
 The 51st State (2001)
 52 Pick-Up (1986)
 52 Tuesdays (2014)
 61* (2001) (TV)
 64: Part I (2016)
 64: Part II (2016)
 #66 (2015)
 '68 (1988)
 #69 Samskar Colony (2022)
 '71 (2014)
 80 for Brady (2023)
 84 Charing Cross Road: (1975 TV & 1987)
 88 (2015)
 92 in the Shade (1975)
 '96 (2018)
 99: (1918 & 2009)
 99 Homes (2014)

100–999 

 100 Days (1991)
 One Hundred Men and a Girl (1937)
 100 Years (2015)
 One Hundred and One Dalmatians (1961)
 101 Dalmatians (1996)
 101 Dalmatians II: Patch's London Adventure (2003)
 101 Reykjavík (2000)
 102 Dalmatians (2000)
 108 Demon Kings (2015)
 120 (2008)
 122 (2019)
 125 Years Memory (2015)
 127 Hours (2010)
 200 Cigarettes (1999)
 211 (2018)
 300 (2007)
 300: Rise of an Empire (2013)
 The 300 Spartans (1962)
 301, 302 (1995)
 305 (2008)
 360 (2011)
 365 Days (2020)
 The 400 Blows (1959)
 404 (2011)
 499 (2020)
 (500) Days of Summer (2009)
 The 601st Phone Call (2006)
 633 Squadron (1964)
 964 Pinocchio (1991)

1000–millions 

 A Thousand Acres (1997)
 A Thousand Clowns (1965)
 1014 (2019)
 1408 (2007)
 1492: Conquest of Paradise (1992)
 1776 (1972)
 1915 (2015)
 #1915House (2018)
 1917: (1970 & 2019)
 1920 (2008)
 1921 (2018)
 1922 (2017)
 1941 (1979)
 1945 (2017)
 1969 (1988)
 1971 (2007)
 1983 (2014)
 1984 (1956)
 Nineteen Eighty-Four (1984)
 1985 (2018)
 1987 (2014)
 1991: The Year Punk Broke (1992)
 2000 Maniacs (1964)
 2001: A Space Odyssey (1968)
 2001: A Space Travesty (2000)
 2009 Lost Memories (2002)
 2010 (1984)
 2012 (2009)
 2019, After the Fall of New York (1984)
 2020 Texas Gladiators (1984)
 2036: Nexus Dawn (2017 short)
 2046 (2004)
 2048: Nowhere to Run (2017 short)
 2050 (2018)
 2067 (2020)
 2081 (2009)
 3000 Miles to Graceland (2001)
 3022 (2019)
 3615 code Père Noël (1989)
 The 5,000 Fingers of Dr. T (1953)
 10000 Years Later (2015)
 708090 (2015)
 Million Dollar Arm (2014)
 Million Dollar Baby (2004)
 The Million Dollar Duck (1971)
 One Million Years B.C. (1966)
 The $1,000,000 Reward (1920)
 Five Million Years to Earth (1967)
 Millions (2004)

Next: List of films: A

See also 
 List of film genres
 Lists of actors
 List of film and television directors
 List of documentary films
 List of film production companies

References